Effa may refer to:

People:
Gaston-Paul Effa (born 1965), Cameroonian writer and philosophy professor 
Karel Effa (1922–1993) Czech actor
Andre Akono Effa, Cameroonian footballer (see Astres FC)

Effa Manley (1897–1981), American sports executive
Effa Ellis Perfield (1873–1967), American educator

Other uses:
Effa Motors,  Uruguayan automotive company
One of the mascots of the Newark Bears